Zavrazhye is a rural locality (a village) and the administrative center of Zavrazhskoye Rural Settlement, Nikolsky District, Vologda Oblast, Russia. The population was 244 as of 2002. There are 8 streets.

Geography 
Zavrazhye is located 30 km southeast of Nikolsk (the district's administrative centre) by road. Yermakovo is the nearest rural locality.

References 

Rural localities in Nikolsky District, Vologda Oblast